The Prequels Strike Back: A Fan's Journey is a 2016 American documentary film directed by Bradley Weatherholt about the Star Wars prequel trilogy. The film contains dozens of interviews from film scholars, critics, academics, and Star Wars fans. Notable interviews include film director Kevin Smith, film critic Chris Gore, actor Christian Simpson, music journalist Doug Adams, and Founding Curator of the Joseph Campbell Archives, Dr. Jonathan Young.

Production
Crowdfunded with a modest budget, production took place over a year as interviews were conducted across the country.

Release
The film was released digitally on September 14, 2016. A theatrical premiere took place on October 6, 2016 in Austin, Texas.

Reception
The Prequels Strike Back: A Fan's Journey received generally positive reviews from critics and fans alike. Chris Agar of Screen Rant noted the film "is a great watch for Star Wars fans and serves as a refreshing discussion on the prequels," while Richard Whittaker of The Austin Chronicle praised the film's deconstruction of George Lucas. Geeks of Doom's review noted: "You might be surprised at what you learn, and what you may have missed this entire time." The Star Wars Prequels Appreciation Society called the film "thoughtful," though it doubted the film would change the minds of "hellbent" fans. Many cite the film as playing a significant role in rethinking the legacy of the prequel films.

References

External links

American documentary films
Crowdfunded films
Star Wars documentaries
2010s English-language films
2010s American films